Tomáš Satoranský (born 30 October 1991) is a Czech professional basketball player for FC Barcelona of the Spanish Liga ACB and the EuroLeague.

Professional career

USK Praha (2007–2009)

From 2007 to 2009, Satoranský played with USK Praha.

Sevilla (2009–2014)
In 2009, Satoranský signed with CB Sevilla of the Spanish ACB League, where he played for the next five seasons. He was selected in the second round of the 2012 NBA draft (32nd overall) by the Washington Wizards. He played at the 2012 NBA Summer League.

Barcelona (2014–2016)
In July 2014, Satoranský signed a two-year deal with FC Barcelona Lassa. In July 2016, he parted ways with Barcelona in order to join the NBA.

Washington Wizards (2016–2019)

On 21 July 2016, Satoranský signed with the Washington Wizards. On 1 December 2017, he scored a career-high 17 points in a 109–91 win over the Detroit Pistons. On 3 February 2018, he set a new career high with 19 points in a 115–98 win over the Orlando Magic. He surpassed that mark a week later, scoring 25 points on 10-of-12 shooting in a 101–90 win over the Chicago Bulls. On 11 January 2019, he recorded his first career triple-double with 18 points, a career-high 12 rebounds and 10 assists in a 113–106 win over the Milwaukee Bucks.

Chicago Bulls (2019–2021)
On 6 July 2019, Satoranský was traded to the Chicago Bulls in a sign-and-trade deal. On 6 January 2020, Satoranský logged 11 points, 5 rebounds and a career-high 14 assists in a 110–118 loss to the Dallas Mavericks.

New Orleans Pelicans (2021–2022)
On 8 August 2021, Satoranský was traded to the New Orleans Pelicans, along with Garrett Temple and draft picks, for Lonzo Ball.

San Antonio Spurs (2022)
On 8 February 2022, the Portland Trail Blazers acquired Satoranský, Nickeil Alexander-Walker, Josh Hart, Didi Louzada, a protected 2022 first-round draft pick, the better of New Orleans’ and Portland’s 2026 second-round draft picks and New Orleans' 2027 second-round draft pick from the New Orleans Pelicans in exchange for CJ McCollum, Larry Nance Jr. and Tony Snell. A day later, Satoranský was traded yet again, this time to the San Antonio Spurs in a three-team trade. He played one game for the Spurs before agreeing to a contract buyout on 26 February 2022.

Return to Washington (2022)
On 28 February 2022, Satoranský signed a rest-of-season contract with the Washington Wizards.

Return to Barcelona (2022)
On 4 July 2022, Satoranský penned a four-year deal with his former club FC Barcelona of the Spanish Liga ACB and the EuroLeague, joining his national squad teammate Jan Veselý under the guidance of coach Šarūnas Jasikevičius.

National team career
Satoranský has played in all of the age categories for the Czech Republic national basketball team. He joined the senior national team for the first time during EuroBasket 2009 qualifiers. In 2010, he played at the 2010 FIBA Europe Under-20 Championship, with the Czech Republic Under-20 junior national team. Satoranský has also represented the Czech senior national team at EuroBasket 2013 and EuroBasket 2015. He also played at EuroBasket 2017, and helped the Czech Republic qualify to the 2019 FIBA World Cup for the first time.

Satoransky scored 14 points in a loss to France in the preliminary round of the 2020 Olympics in Tokyo.

Career statistics

NBA

Regular season

|-
| style="text-align:left;"|
| style="text-align:left;"|Washington
| 57 || 3 || 12.6 || .418 || .243 || .697 || 1.5 || 1.6 || .5 || .1 || 2.7
|-
| style="text-align:left;"|
| style="text-align:left;"|Washington
| 73 || 30 || 22.5 || .523 || .465 || .781 || 3.2 || 3.9 || .7 || .2 || 7.2
|-
| style="text-align:left;"|
| style="text-align:left;"|Washington
| 80 || 54 || 27.1 || .485 || .395 || .819 || 3.5 || 5.0 || 1.0 || .2 || 8.9
|-
| style="text-align:left;"|
| style="text-align:left;"|Chicago
| 65 || 64 || 28.9 || .430 || .322 || .876 || 3.9 || 5.4 || 1.2 || .1 || 9.9
|- 
| style="text-align:left;"|
| style="text-align:left;"|Chicago
| 58 || 18 || 22.5 || .514 || .356 || .848 || 2.4 || 4.7 || .7 || .2 || 7.7
|- 
| style="text-align:left;"|
| style="text-align:left;"|New Orleans
| 32 || 3 || 15.0 || .299 || .161 || .760 || 2.0 || 2.4 || .4 || .0 || 2.8
|- 
| style="text-align:left;"|
| style="text-align:left;"|San Antonio
| 1 || 0 || 9.0 ||  ||  || .750 || 1.0 || .0 || .0 || .0 || 3.0
|- 
| style="text-align:left;"|
| style="text-align:left;"|Washington
| 22 || 10 || 18.9 || .476 || .273 || .840 || 2.8 || 4.9 || .7 || .2 || 4.9
|- class="sortbottom"
| style="text-align:center;" colspan="2"|Career
| 388 || 182 || 22.2 || .468 || .354 || .820 || 2.9 || 4.1 || .8 || .2 || 6.9

Playoffs

|-
| style="text-align:left;"|2017
| style="text-align:left;"|Washington
| 10 || 0 || 3.6 || .500 ||  || .400 || .5 || .6 || .1 || .0 || .8
|-
| style="text-align:left;"|2018
| style="text-align:left;"|Washington
| 6 || 0 || 10.0 || .154 || .000 || .750 || 1.5 || .5 || .0 || .0 || 1.2
|- class="sortbottom"
| style="text-align:center;" colspan="2"|Career
| 16 || 0 || 6.0 || .263 || .000 || .556 || .9 || .6 || .1 || .0 || .9

EuroLeague

|-
| style="text-align:left;"|2014–15
| style="text-align:left;"|Barcelona
| 27 || 12 || 19.2 || .470 || .391 || .850 || 3.0 || 3.2 || .8 || .2 || 7.2 || 10.7
|-
| style="text-align:left;"|2015–16
| style="text-align:left;"|Barcelona
| 29 || 27 || 24.5 || .567 || .366 || .755 || 2.8 || 4.3 || .9 || .3 || 9.0 || 12.0
|- class="sortbottom"
| style="text-align:center;" colspan="2"|Career
| 56 || 39 || 21.9 || .519 || .379 || .803 || 2.9 || 3.8 || .9 || .3 || 8.1 || 11.4

Domestic leagues

|-
| style="text-align:left;" | 2007-08 NBL
| style="text-align:left;" |  USK Praha
| 27 || - || 14.6  || .470 || .226 || .742 || 2.3 || 1.4 || .6 || .1 || 6.1
|-
| style="text-align:left;" | 2008-09 NBL
| style="text-align:left;" |  USK Praha
| 35 || - || 22.5  || .484 || .256 || .738 || 4.6 || 2.1 || 1.0 || .1 || 9.9
|-
| style="text-align:left;" | 2009-10 ACB
| style="text-align:left;" |  Sevilla
| 27 || 0 || 7.4  || .489 || .273 || .789 || .7 || .9 || .3 || .0 || 2.4
|-
| style="text-align:left;" | 2010-11 ACB
| style="text-align:left;" |  Sevilla
| 34 || 19 || 20.9  || .463 || .407 || .719 || 2.2 || 2.3 || .9 || .1 || 7.0
|-
| style="text-align:left;" | 2011-12 ACB
| style="text-align:left;" |  Sevilla
| 34 || 9 || 17.3  || .428 || .273 || .705 || 2.2 || 1.4 || .6 || .0 || 4.8
|-
| style="text-align:left;" | 2012-13 ACB
| style="text-align:left;" |  Sevilla
| 33 || 33 || 29.2  || .469 || .342 || .786 || 3.1 || 4.2 || 1.2 || .2 || 12.4
|-
| style="text-align:left;" | 2013-14 ACB
| style="text-align:left;" |  Sevilla
| 34 || 33 || 30.8  || .474 || .367 || .813 || 3.7 || 4.6 || 1.5 || .1 || 12.4
|-
| style="text-align:left;" | 2014-15 ACB
| style="text-align:left;" |  FC Barcelona
| 31 || 18 || 19.9  || .579 || .480 || .822 || 2.9 || 3.0 || .8 || .2 || 7.8
|-
| style="text-align:left;" | 2015-16 ACB
| style="text-align:left;" |  FC Barcelona
| 33 || 30 || 24.1  || .509 || .414 || .802 || 3.0 || 4.2 || 1.0 || .1 || 10.1

References

External links

 Tomáš Satoranský at acb.com 
 Tomáš Satoranský at euroleague.net
 Tomáš Satoranský at fiba.com
 Tomáš Satoranský at fibaeurope.com

1991 births
Living people
2019 FIBA Basketball World Cup players
Basketball players at the 2020 Summer Olympics
Chicago Bulls players
Czech expatriate basketball people in Spain
Czech expatriate basketball people in the United States
Czech men's basketball players
FC Barcelona Bàsquet players
Liga ACB players
New Orleans Pelicans players
Olympic basketball players of the Czech Republic
Point guards
Real Betis Baloncesto players
San Antonio Spurs players
Shooting guards
Sportspeople from Prague
Washington Wizards draft picks
Washington Wizards players